Kelly Ripa (born October 2, 1970) is an American actress and talk show host. Since 2001, she has been the co-host of the syndicated morning talk show Live! with Kelly and Ryan in various formats.

As an actress, Ripa's best known roles include Hayley Vaughan on the ABC daytime soap opera All My Children (1990–2002, 2010) and Faith Fairfield on the ABC sitcom Hope & Faith (2003–2006). Ripa and her husband, Mark Consuelos, own a New York-based production company, Milojo. In 2014, The Hollywood Reporter named her one of the Most Powerful People in Media.

Early life
Kelly Maria Ripa was born and raised in Berlin, New Jersey, the daughter of Esther, a homemaker, and Joseph Ripa, a labor union president and bus driver who attended Rutgers University. She has a sister, Linda, who is a children's book author. She was on a local PHL17 dance show, called Dancing on Air, before it got picked up by USA Network and was renamed Dance Party USA.  Kelly did several chat line commercials asking guys to call the "hot line" where us "hot girls" are always on the phone.  Commercials always aired after midnight in the local Philadelphia market.  She has three-quarters Italian and one-quarter Irish ancestry. Ripa was raised Catholic. Her father has been the Democratic County Clerk for Camden County, New Jersey, since June 2009.

Ripa graduated from Eastern Regional High School in Voorhees Township, New Jersey. During her high school years she was a cheerleader and was encouraged by her drama teacher to pursue acting. "I owe so much of my career to Jim Boeckle," she said. "He thought I was a natural performer and so he gave me the lead in the next show." She starred in local theater productions and was discovered while performing in The Ugly Duckling during her senior year. She attended Camden County College studying psychology, but dropped out and moved to New York City to pursue an acting career.

Career

Dancin' on Air, Dance Party USA and All My Children 
Aside from local TV gigs, Ripa's first national television exposure came in 1986 when she appeared as a regular dancer on Dancin' On Air, leading into Dance Party USA. Her career goal at the time was to be a newscaster and she often did the cast news reports.

Ripa was cast in her first major acting role in 1990 as Hayley Vaughan, a troubled party girl, on All My Children. She concluded her 12-year stint in 2002, but returned for two episodes in 2010 to help celebrate the soap opera's 40th anniversary.

Live!
After co-host Kathie Lee Gifford's final show on Live! with Regis and Kathie Lee, Regis Philbin began holding on-air auditions to find her replacement. In his autobiography, How I Got This Way, Philbin says of discovering Ripa:

There was one guest we'd had on with us a few years before who had [a certain sparkle]. Hers was a natural, quick-witted, unaffected, confident, fun-loving kind of sparkle that both Gelman and I remembered very well. We decided to invite her back, this time to consider her as a possible co-host. So that was when this smiling, petite ball of fire named Kelly Ripa made her return to Live! for a test run at the rotating, up-for-grabs hot seat to my left. And my God, who knew what spontaneous combustion we'd make together?

On the day of Ripa's initial Live! with Regis tryout (November 1, 2000), psychic Char Margolis was among the guests. During this segment, Margolis guessed that Ripa was pregnant with her second child. Ripa replied, "I haven't told my boss yet!" Philbin later said that Ripa was first among the potential candidates including Jane Krakowski, Valerie Bertinelli, Dolly Parton, and Bernadette Peters: "[I]t could only be Kelly. We knew that from her memorable debut onward." Ripa was announced as the official replacement on February 5, 2001. Within months the renamed Live! with Regis and Kelly'''s young-audience demographics increased by 80 percent with Ripa credited for bringing "a new life to the show."

The chemistry between Philbin and Ripa (or "Pippa" as he nicknamed her), their banter, interviews, and conversations about their families, personal lives, and New York City attracted a successful, strong, and loyal viewership averaging 6 million viewers daily. In January 2011, Philbin, 80, announced that he would be retiring from Live! at the end of the year. His final show aired Friday, November 18, 2011, during which Ripa tearfully reminisced about her first day, the 43 steps they walked together from her dressing room onto set each day for 11 years, and how those 43 steps changed her life. "Thank you for everything! It's been just great my Pippa," Philbin told her in an embrace. Ripa responded, "Thank you for everything. I love you." "I love you, too," said Philbin.

Ripa replaced Philbin as the head of the show and returned the following Monday, November 21, 2011, to continue the show, which was re-titled Live! with Kelly. In a process similar to the one in which she was selected to replace Gifford, a rotating lineup of co-hosts auditioned on-air with Ripa to take over her former co-hosting duties, including: Michael Strahan, Seth Meyers, Josh Groban, Nick Lachey, Neil Patrick Harris, Chris Harrison, Jerry O'Connell, Joel McHale, Carrie Ann Inaba, Bryant Gumbel, Jerry Seinfeld, Mike Greenberg, Boomer Esiason, Dan Abrams, Martin Short, Howie Mandel, Pat Kiernan, Jesse Palmer, D.L. Hughley, Derek Hough, Sam Champion, Taye Diggs, Ben Mulroney, Kevin Jonas, Randy Jackson, Michael Bublé, Peter Facinelli, Rob Lowe, Dana Carvey, Reggie Bush, Fred Savage, and Mario Lopez. In the end, Strahan was announced as the new co-host and Live! with Kelly and Michael premiered September 4, 2012.Live! won its first Daytime Emmy Award for Outstanding Talk Show on June 23, 2012.

On May 16, 2016, the show's name was changed to Live! with Kelly again after Strahan's last show before his move to Good Morning America. Another round of guest co-hosts ensued. On May 1, 2017, the show became Live with Kelly and Ryan, after Ryan Seacrest took over as Strahan's permanent replacement.

Hope & Faith
Ripa ventured into primetime in September 2003 on Hope & Faith, playing Faith Fairfield, an unemployed ex-soap star. The half-hour sitcom, co-starring Faith Ford, Ted McGinley, and Megan Fox, gave ABC its best Friday premiere score since 1996. The show ended in May 2006 with Ripa declaring she "never wanted to work that hard again."

Film
Best known for her television work, Ripa also has several feature films to her credit. She appeared in the acclaimed Miramax feature Marvin's Room in 1996 alongside Meryl Streep and Leonardo DiCaprio.

Other ventures

Spokesperson
Ripa serves as a spokesperson for several companies. In the past, she has partnered with Tide, 7 Up, Pantene, and TD Bank, but currently works primarily with Electrolux and Rykä.

Rykä announced Ripa as the spokesperson for the brand's footwear and sporting apparel in 2008. Ripa oversees the design of her own fitness-inspired active wear line, The Kelly Ripa Collection.

Ripa stars in the Electrolux television and print advertising, and her image is used on point of sale materials and extensively online.

Charity
Ripa is a supporter of the ovarian cancer cause, and has teamed with Electrolux to raise funds for The Ovarian Cancer Research Fund. Every summer, she hosts an event called Super Saturday, a day-long fundraising event. 2011's event raised over $3.5 million for OCRF. Ripa attributes her dedication to the experience of losing a friend to ovarian cancer. In 2001, she appeared on a celebrity version of Who Wants to Be a Millionaire?, hosted by Philbin. She won $250,000 for Tomorrow's Children's Fund, a non-profit organization dedicated to speeding the healing of children with cancer and serious blood disorders.

Ripa is also an active participant in Mothers Against Drunk Driving. According to Ripa, her involvement with MADD is motivated by her sister, Linda, who was almost killed by a drunk driver in 1999.

Production company
In 2007, Ripa and her husband Mark Consuelos founded Milojo, the production company, named for their children Michael, Lola, and Joaquin. It began with the Emmy-nominated feature documentary The Streak, which told the story of the Brandon High School wrestling team and its 34-year winning streak. It premiered at the Tribeca Film Festival in 2008. In addition, Milojo launched a first look development deal with Discovery Channel for non-scripted series' including Homemade Millionaire, hosted by Ripa, and the docu-series Masters of Reception. Their next film, Off the Rez, was also accepted to the Tribeca Film Festival and premiered on TLC in May 2011. In 2012, the company premiered its first short film, a collaboration with Will Ferrell's Funny or Die entitled "The Bensonhurst Spelling Bee" featuring Ripa, Consuelos, and their son, Michael. The video has had over 1,000,000 views.  In 2021, Ripa and Consuelos served as co-executive producers of the Oxygen series Exhumed, which debuted on January 17.

Awards and honors
In 1999, she won the Best Actress Award at the New York International Independent Film and Video Festival for her work in The Stand-In.

In 2007 and 2012, Ripa hosted the TV Land Awards to very positive reviews. She, herself, is an award winner, garnering five Soap Opera Digest Awards and three Daytime Emmy Award nominations for playing Hayley Vaughan on All My Children.

Ripa was also recognized for her work on the Disney Parks Christmas Day Parade, which she co-hosted from 2001–2009, with the Emmy Award for Outstanding Special Class Special in 2006. She and co-host Regis Philbin have also twice won the Daytime Emmy Award for Outstanding Talk Show Host for Live! with Regis and Kelly, for which they also received 12 Emmy Award nominations and 4 People's Choice Award nominations. Subsequently, for Live! with Kelly and Michael, She and co-host Michael Strahan won the Daytime Emmy Award for Outstanding Entertainment Talk Show Host for their work in 2015 and 2016.

The Broadcast Pioneers inducted Ripa into their Hall of Fame for her tremendous success in the television industry on November 19, 2010, and also honoured her as their Person of the Year.

On October 12, 2015, the Hollywood Chamber of Commerce honored Kelly Ripa with a star on the Hollywood Walk of Fame.

On September 15, 2006, Ripa broke the Guinness World Record as twenty-four banana-cream pies were tossed at her mouth in one minute, as part of a Guinness World Record Breaker theme week on Live!. On September 16, 2011, Ripa broke the Guinness World Record for Most Grapes Trodden in 1 Minute, of 5.4 litres, as she extracted 8.4 litres. However, her competitor, Martina Servaty of Germany, extracted even more (8.6 litres), preventing Ripa from holding the new record.

In 2008, Cowboy Mouth, a New Orleans, Louisiana-based rock band, honored Ripa by writing a song in tribute, entitled "Kelly Ripa", that appeared on their album Fearless. The band performed the song on Live! on March 13, 2008.

In 2017, Ripa was inducted into the New Jersey Hall of Fame.

In 2019 she was honored with her sixth daytime Emmy award.

Personal life
In 1995, Ripa met Mark Consuelos, her co-star on All My Children. The two eloped on May 1, 1996. The couple have three children: Michael Joseph (born June 2, 1997), Lola Grace (born June 16, 2001), and Joaquin Antonio (born February 24, 2003).

For many years, they lived on Crosby Street in SoHo, Manhattan, but they sold that home in 2015 for $20 million. In 2015, they moved to a townhouse on East 76th Street. They bought the place in 2013, though it was never officially listed on the market, for $27 million from fashion designer  Luca Orlandi and his wife, Oluchi Onweagba, making it the second most expensive townhouse sold in NYC that year.

In 2011, Kelly revealed she had misophonia.

Ripa is a fan of the NFL's Philadelphia Eagles. On a Live episode that aired in February 2018, she wore high heeled shoes in their team colors (green, black and white) to celebrate their qualification in Super Bowl LII.

Filmography

See also

 List of All My Children cast members
 List of American film actresses
 List of American television actresses
 List of people from New Jersey
 List of people from New York City
 List of talk show hosts
 New Yorkers in journalism

Books

References

External links

 

 Official website for Live! with Kelly''
 
 

1970 births
20th-century American actresses
21st-century American actresses
Actresses from New Jersey
Actresses from New York City
American film actresses
American people of Irish descent
American people of Italian descent
American soap opera actresses
American television actresses
American television talk show hosts
Daytime Emmy Award for Outstanding Talk Show Host winners
Eastern Regional High School alumni
Living people
People from Berlin, New Jersey
People from Franklin Lakes, New Jersey
People from SoHo, Manhattan
People from Stratford, New Jersey
People from the Upper East Side
People with misophonia
Camden County College alumni